Fernando Andrés Quiroz Calderón (born 9 September 1997) is a Chilean footballer who plays for Deportes Iberia in the Segunda División Profesional de Chile.

References

External links
 

1997 births
Living people
Chilean footballers
Deportes Temuco footballers
Deportes Iberia footballers
San Antonio Unido footballers
Primera B de Chile players
Chilean Primera División players
Segunda División Profesional de Chile players
Association football midfielders
Place of birth missing (living people)